Femme Fatale is a 1991 American drama film, directed by Andre R. Guttfreund.

Cast
Billy Zane as Elijah
Lisa Zane as Cynthia
Colin Firth as Joseph Prince
Scott Wilson as Dr. Beaumont
Suzanne Snyder as Andrea
Pat Skipper as Ted
John Lavachielli as Ed
Lisa Blount as Jenny Purge
Carmine Caridi as Dino
Danny Trejo as Toshi
Catherine E. Coulson as Sister Mary
Tommy Morgan as Louis
Roberto Luis Santana as Artist

References

External links

1991 drama films
American drama films
1990s English-language films
1990s American films